Wuxi fried spare ribs is a kind of Chinese traditional food from Wuxi City, Jiangsu Province, China. They are made from high quality pork ribs and a number of seasonings, like soy sauce, sugar and ginger.

References 

Pork dishes
Culture in Wuxi
Jiangsu cuisine